VST & Co. was a Filipino disco group formed in 1978, who were part of the Manila sound genre.

Albums

Studio albums

Compilation albums
Awitin Mo at Isasayaw Ko (1994)
The Best of VST & Co. (2002)

Singles
"Ikaw ang Aking Mahal" / "Awitin Mo at Isasayaw Ko" (1978)
"Disco Fever" / "Magsayawan" (1978)
"Swing" / "Ayos Ba?" (1978)
"Rock Baby Rock" / "Ride On 'Ragsy'" (1979)
"Kiss Kiss" / "Step No, Step Yes" (1979)
"Merry Christmas (Para Sa Iyo)" /"Boogie Woogie Christmas Day" (1979)
"Magnifica" / "Etcetera" (1979)
"The Disco Rock" / "Puwede Ba" (1980)
"Pakita Mo" / "Super Lover" (1980)

References

Discographies of Filipino artists